Akiu may refer to:

 Akiu, Miyagi, town in Natori District, Miyagi Prefecture, Japan
 Akiu no Taue Odori, traditional rice-planting dance in Akiu, Miyagi
 Akiu Great Falls, waterfall in Sendai, Miyagi Prefecture, Japan
 Mike Akiu (born 1962), American football player